This list of botanical gardens in Japan is intended to include all significant botanical gardens and arboretums in Japan.

 Akatsuka Botanical Garden (Itabashi, Tokyo)
 Aloha Garden Tateyama (Tateyama, Chiba)
 Amami Islands Botanical Garden (Amami, Kagoshima)
 Aoshima Subtropical Botanical Garden (Miyazaki, Miyazaki)
 Aritaki Arboretum (Koshigaya, Saitama)
 Atagawa Tropical & Alligator Garden (Kamo, Shizuoka)

 Botanic Garden, Faculty of Science, Kanazawa University (Kanazawa, Ishikawa)
 Botanical Garden of Tohoku University (Sendai, Miyagi)
 Botanic Gardens of Toyama (Toyama, Toyama)
 Botanical Gardens Faculty of Science Osaka City University (Katano, Osaka)

 Enoshima Tropical Plants Garden (Fujisawa, Kanagawa)
 Experimental Station for Landscape Plants (Chiba, Chiba)

 Fuji Bamboo Garden (Nagaizumi, Shizuoka)
 Fukuoka Municipal Zoo and Botanical Garden (Fukuoka, Fukuoka)
 Futagami Manyo Botanical Gardens (Takaoka, Toyama)

 Hakone Botanical Garden of Wetlands (Hakone, Kanagawa)
 Handayama Botanical Garden (Okayama, Okayama)
 Hattori Ryokuchi Arboretum (Toyonaka, Osaka)
 Higashiyama Zoo and Botanical Gardens (Nagoya, Aichi)
 Himeji City Tegarayama Botanical Garden (Himeji, Hyōgo)
 Himi Seaside Botanical Garden (Himi, Toyama)
 Hiroshima Botanical Garden (Hiroshima, Hiroshima)
 Hirugano Botanical Garden (Gujō, Gifu)
 Hokkaido University Botanical Gardens (Sapporo, Hokkaidō)

 Ibaraki Botanical Garden (Naka, Ibaraki)
 Ibusuki Experimental Botanical Garden (Ibusuki, Kagoshima)
 Ishikawa Forest Experiment Station (Hakusan, Ishikawa)
 Itabashi Botanical Garden (Itabashi, Tokyo)

 Jindai Botanical Garden (Chōfu, Tokyo)

 Kagoshima Botanical Garden (Kagoshima, Kagoshima)
 Kanagawa Prefectural Ofuna Botanical Garden (Kamakura, Kanagawa)
 Kawaguchi Green Center (Kawaguchi, Saitama)
 Kiseki No Hoshi Greenhouse (Awaji, Hyōgo)
 Kitayama Botanical Garden (Nishinomiya, Hyōgo)
 Kobe Municipal Arboretum (Kōbe, Hyōgo)
 Koishikawa Botanical Gardens (Bunkyō, Tokyo)
 Kosobe Conservatory (Takatsuki, Osaka)
 Kubota Palm Garden (Masaki, Ehime)
 Kyoto Botanical Garden (Kyoto, Kyoto)

 Makino Botanical Garden (Kōchi, Kōchi)
 Manyo Botanical Garden, Nara (Nara, Nara)
 Michinoku Mano-Manyo Botanical Garden (Kashima, Fukushima)
 Mito Municipal Botanical Park (Mito, Ibaraki)
 Miyajima Natural Botanical Garden (Hatsukaichi, Hiroshima)
 Miyakojima City Tropical Plant Garden (Miyakojima, Okinawa)
 Mizunomori Water Botanical Garden (Kusatsu, Shiga)

 Nagai Botanical Garden (Osaka, Osaka)
 Nagasaki Subtropical Botanical Garden (Nagasaki, Nagasaki)
 Niigata Prefectural Botanical Garden (Niigata, Niigata)
 Nikko Botanical Garden (Nikkō, Tochigi)
 Nunobiki Herb Garden (Kōbe, Hyōgo)

 Omoro Botanical Garden (Motobu, Okinawa)

 Rokkō Alpine Botanical Garden (Kōbe, Hyōgo)

 Sakuya Konohana Kan (Osaka, Osaka)
 Samuel Cocking Garden (Enoshima)
 Sasebo Zoological Park and Botanical Garden (Sasebo, Nagasaki)
 Seinan Gakuin University Biblical Botanical Garden (Fukuoka, Fukuoka)
 Shimokamo Tropical Botanical Gardens (Kamo, Shizuoka)
 Shimizu_Park (Noda, Chiba)
 Southeast Botanical Gardens (Okinawa, Okinawa)
 Suigō Sawara Aquatic Botanical Garden (Katori, Chiba)
 Suma Rikyu Park (Kōbe, Hyōgo)

 Tajima Plateau Botanical Gardens (Kami, Hyōgo)
 Tama Forest Science Garden (Hachiōji, Tokyo)
 Tennōji Botanical Garden (Osaka, Osaka)

 Tokyo University of Agriculture Botanical Garden (Atsugi, Kanagawa)
 Tropical & Subtropical Arboretum (Kunigami, Okinawa)
 Tsukuba Botanical Garden (Tsukuba, Ibaraki)

 Wakayama Prefecture Botanical Park (Iwade, Wakayama)
 Yamashina Botanical Research Institute (Kyoto, Kyoto)
 Yokohama Municipal Children's Botanical Garden (Yokohama, Kanagawa)
 Yumenoshima Tropical Greenhouse Dome (Kōtō, Tokyo)

External links 
 BGBI Garden Search for Japan
 Jardins Botaniques Japonais (French)

See also 
 List of botanical gardens

Botanical gardens in Japan
Japan
Botanical gardens